Westover Hills Presbyterian Church is a congregation of the Presbyterian Church (USA) in Little Rock, AR. Westover Hills is notable for its history in the Civil Rights struggle in Little Rock and the work of its then pastor Richard B. Hardie, Jr. in support of integration of the Little Rock Public Schools. The congregation continues to take public stances on many controversial issues including racial reconciliation, prisoners’ rights, and advocacy for LGBTQIA+ members of the community.

History 
Westover Hills Presbyterian Church was founded in 1948 as part of a push to build churches in what was then western Little Rock. A group of 30 members of Second Presbyterian Church in downtown Little Rock began meeting as a “chapel” of Second Presbyterian. Second continued to provide financial assistance to Westover Hills until the new church became self-sustaining.

In the 1950’s as the fledgling church was continuing to grow toward sustainability and self-sufficiency, the city and nation were roiled by the early chapters of the Civil Rights Movement. Dr. Hardie emerged as a leader in the city in efforts to integrate the Little Rock Public Schools and to dismantle the structures of Jim Crow. Hardie was unapologetic in his support of these causes that he saw as matters of both faith and fundamental justice. Hardie would later march with Martin Luther King, Jr. in Selma, a decision that would cost him opportunities to serve many southern churches.

Following Hardie’s lead, the congregation of Westover Hills took public stances including publicly declaring their doors open to all races when most churches were still actively segregated and openly opposing the closure of the Little Rock Public Schools over the issue of integration. When the schools were closed by Governor Orval Faubus, Westover Hills along with Second Baptist and Trinity Episcopal churches opened its doors to students whose families created makeshift schools for the “lost year."

The work of the congregation in local and national issues of importance continued under the leadership of Dr. David Dyer, Revs. Jim and Debbie Freeman, and Rev. Frank LeBlanc.

In the fall of 2021, the congregation called Dr. Robert W. Lowry to serve as the sixth pastor of Westover Hills.  A native of Little Rock, Lowry came to Westover Hills from Fondren Presbyterian Church in Jackson, MS. In addition to Fondren, Lowry has served churches in Texas, Louisiana, Michigan, Scotland, and Arkansas. Lowry, one of the first openly gay ministers in the Presbyterian Church (USA), works in advocacy for the LGBTQIA+ community with a particular focus on rights for Transgender persons. In 2015 the Arkansas Times named Lowry as one of 25 Visionary Arkansans making an impact on the state. He was also featured in an episode of the PBS series Prideland.

Facilities 
The church sits at the roundabout intersection of Kavanaugh Blvd., McKinley St., and Pine Valley Drive. When the church was founded, the intersection in front of the building was the western terminus of the Little Rock streetcar line on what was then the western edge of the city. .

The original building was a small red-brick structure built in a traditional style with some neo-Colonial features. Since its founding the church has hosted a pre-school for children up to age 5. The original structure served as the home of the church until a new facility was built on the property. The new church building, still in use as of 2022, is built in the modern style and features a nave designed in the round with a chancel platform extending into the center of the worship space. Unique to Presbyterian churches in Arkansas, the Westover Hills nave features kneelers in each pew. Below the sanctuary are classrooms, choir rehearsal space, and the “New Chapel.” Beginning in fall 2022, the New Chapel  will host San Damiano Eccumenical Catholic Church. 

A new multi-million-dollar facility for the preschool and congregational use was begun in 2005. The facility includes a regulation basketball court that doubles as the church Fellowship Hall, classrooms for the preschool and church activities, and a full commercial kitchen. The original church building continues to be used as office and meeting space. In 2011 the chapel was renamed “Hardie Chapel” in thanksgiving for Richard Hardie’s many years of service.

Church facilities are used by many outside groups including Barely Legal Young-people’s Group (a part of Alcoholics Anonymous), a local volleyball academy, neighborhood associations, and other groups. 

The copper clad roof with the Celtic cross topping the cupola serves as a landmark in the neighborhood and can be seen from many vantages in the northern part of Little Rock.

Pastors 
Westover Hills has been served by six installed pastors and numerous interim pastors since its founding. Each pastor left their own imprint on the congregation. Common to all the pastors at Westover Hills is a commitment to progressive causes important to the church. The pastors of Westover Hills include:
 Dr. Richard B. Hardie Jr. (Founding Pastor) 1949-1985
 Dr. David Dyer
 Revs. Jim and Debbie Freeman
 Rev. Frank LeBlanc
 Dr. Robert W. Lowry 2022-

References 

Presbyterian churches in Arkansas
1948 establishments in Arkansas
Churches in Little Rock, Arkansas